Narcis Coman (born 5 November 1946 in Giurgiu) is a retired Romanian footballer who played as a goalkeeper and was selected Romanian Footballer of the Year in 1978.

Honours
Steaua București
Cupa României: 1970–71
SC Bacău
Divizia B: 1974–75
CS Târgoviște
Divizia B: 1976–77

Individual
Romanian Footballer of the Year: 1978

Notes

References

External links

1946 births
Living people
Romanian footballers
Olympic footballers of Romania
Romania international footballers
FC UTA Arad players
FC Dinamo București players
FC Argeș Pitești players
FC Steaua București players
FCM Bacău players
FCM Târgoviște players
Liga I players
Liga II players
Association football goalkeepers
People from Giurgiu